Rorodt is an Ortsgemeinde – a municipality belonging to a Verbandsgemeinde, a kind of collective municipality – in the Bernkastel-Wittlich district in Rhineland-Palatinate, Germany.

Geography 

The municipality lies in the Hunsrück and belongs to the Verbandsgemeinde of Thalfang am Erbeskopf, whose seat is in the municipality of Thalfang.

History 

In 1136, Rorodt had its first documentary mention as Roveroth. Rorodt belonged until Secularization to the Archbishopric of Trier and was part of the Mark Thalfang, a territory roughly corresponding to today's Verbandsgemeinde. After French rule ended, the village passed in 1814 to the Kingdom of Prussia. Since 1947, it has been part of the then newly founded state of Rhineland-Palatinate.

Politics 

The municipal council is made up of 6 council members, who were elected by majority vote proportional representation at the municipal election held on 7 June 2009, and the honorary mayor as chairman.

References

External links 

 Municipality’s official webpage 

Bernkastel-Wittlich